Bandar Sri Damansara is a residential township in Petaling District, Selangor, Malaysia. The township is divided into two sections, SD1-SD5 in the north and SD7-SD15 in the south which are separated by Kuala Selangor-Kepong Highway. It is adjacent to Kepong and Sungai Buloh. The township consists of mixed development of commercial and residential properties. It was previously developed by Land and General Berhad and currently by TA Global.

Location 

Bandar Sri Damansara is a freehold residential and commercial zone located in the Klang Valley, with a district code of Petaling Jaya Utara 9 (PJU 9). The township is located just north of Damansara Perdana (PJU 8), and east of Damansara Damai (PJU 10), and is within proximity to other townships such as Kepong, Kota Damansara (PJU 5), Bandar Utama (PJU 6), Mutiara Damansara (PJU 7), Bandar Menjalara, Sierramas and Valencia. It is situated opposite Desa Park City and Sunway SPK Damansara. Bandar Sri Damansara is the only township in Petaling Jaya using the same postcode of Kuala Lumpur.

Accessibility

Car
Bandar Sri Damansara has road networks with accessibility via New Klang Valley Expressway , Sprint Expressway's Penchala Link , and MRR2 Federal Route 28, as well as a shortcut to the Kuala Selangor-Kepong Highway Federal Route 54. The Damansara–Puchong Expressway runs on the eastern boundary of the township. A new Sri Damansara Link to Duta–Ulu Klang Expressway is constructed to allow easier access into the Kuala Lumpur City Centre, and to decrease the traffic congestion in the Damansara–Puchong Expressway (LDP).

Public transportation
Bandar Sri Damansara is served by three Mass Rapid Transit (MRT) stations,  Sri Damansara Barat MRT station,  Sri Damansara Sentral MRT station and  Sri Damansara Timur MRT station on the Putrajaya line.

MRT Feeder buses (T106, T107, T108 and T110) serve as the first-last mile connectivity in Bandar Sri Damansara, Wangsa Permai, Desa Park City, Bandar Menjalara and Taman Bukit Maluri to  Sri Damansara Barat MRT station,  Sri Damansara Sentral MRT station and  Sri Damansara Timur MRT station.

rapidKL bus 801 (formerly U86) connects Bandar Sri Damansara to  MRT Mutiara Damansara and  KTM Kepong Sentral.

PJ City Bus bus (PJ06) connects Bandar Sri Damansara to  MRT Mutiara Damansara,  Bandar Utama MRT station (via Bandar Utama bus hub).

Education

Elementary
 One Chinese primary school: SJK (C) Desa Jaya 2
 Four government primary schools:
SK Bandar Baru Sri Damansara
SK Bandar Sri Damansara (1)
SK Bandar Sri Damansara (2)
 SK Bandar Sri Damansara (3)

Secondary

 SMK Bandar Sri Damansara (1)
 SMK Bandar Sri Damansara (2)

International schools

 International School - Sri Bestari

Tertiary

 Private University - Twintech International University College of Technology

Community buildings 

Masjid Al-Mukarramah Bandar Sri Damansara 
Methodist Church
Glad Tidings Church
Bandar Sri Damansara Police Station
Bandar Sri Damansara Club
Ariya Vihara Buddhist Society
Aloka Foundation
FBC Chi Bei Xue Hui Buddhist Centre
Full Gospel Tabernacle Church
SIBKLCC Church (City Community)
Surau Al-Muhajirin

Administration 
Bandar Sri Damansara, like most of Damansara, falls under the jurisdiction of the Majlis Bandaraya Petaling Jaya (Petaling Jaya City Council), and is represented in parliament by Tony Pua of DAP under the constituency of Damansara. On the Selangor State Legislative Assembly, Bandar Sri Damansara falls under the constituency of Bukit Lanjan, currently represented by Elizabeth Wong, also from PKR.

Awards 
 Bandar Sri Damansara- Winner of the Fiabci Malaysia Property Award 1996
 Damansara Foresta- Asia Pacific 2013 Award & MLAA 2016 Award
 Damansara Avenue- Asia Pacific 2016 Award
 Damansara Seresta- iProperty Development Excellence Awards 2018 (Best Residential High-Rise Development)
8 mall, luxury hotel, sports complex, performing arts centre, and a luxurious signature residential tower.
 TA Global Bhd's director Datin Alicia Tiah revealed last July of this year that the group has future plans of building a flyover in Bandar Sri Damansara, allowing easier access to other residential developments such as Damansara Perdana, Taman Tun Dr. Ismail, Valencia, Sierramas and Desa Park City.
 Bandar Sri Damansara West Mass Rapid Transit (MRT) station is now functional, allowing easier means of transportation for the residents of Bandar Sri Damansara. It serves as one of the stations on Klang Valley Mass Rapid Transit (KVMRT) Sungai Buloh-Serdang-Putrajaya Line. The station is located near the 8Trium office building.
 Land and General Bhd has plans to redevelop its current 14 acres clubhouse of Bandar Sri Damansara into an integrated mixed-development which consists of a modern, upgraded clubhouse, service apartments, retail, and offices to cater to the current and upcoming residents's needs. However, this proposal is still in an initial stage of getting consents from the current club members.

Notes

External links 
 Bandar Sri Damansara

Populated places established in 1996
1996 establishments in Malaysia
Petaling District
Townships in Selangor